Pyrenees may refer to any of three mountain ranges:
 Pyrenees, on the Franco-Spanish border
 Pyrenees (Victoria), in the western region of Victoria, Australia
 Montes Pyrenaeus, on the moon

Pyrenees may also refer to:
 Pyrénées (Paris Métro) is a station of the Paris Métro. 
 Pyrenean Mountain Dog, a dog breed.
 Pyrenees (roller coaster)
 Pyrenees, Four-masted barque (prison ship)

See also
 Pyrenean (disambiguation)